is a female Japanese manga artist, illustrator, animator, director, character designer, and an animation director.

Biography
Kakinouchi was born in Osaka Prefecture, Japan. After graduating from high school, she began working at Studio Beebo under the direction of Tomonori Kogawa, then moving on to Studio Io, Artland, AIC and other studios where she was an animator, designer, and animation director on many TV series and OVAs. She made her manga and character designer debut with Vampire Princess Miyu.

Kakinouchi made her key animation debut with her work on the 1980 series Space Runaway Ideon. She then garnered great attention as the character designer, storyboard artist, and animation director for the Vampire Princess Miyu OVAs in 1988, and in March of that same year she co-authored the first Vampire Princess Miyu manga, serialized in the mystery/horror monthly manga magazine Susperia.

She made her directorial debut with Ryokunohara Labyrinth in 1990, in addition to being the character designer, scenario creator, storyboard artist, and animation director for the OVA.

In addition to her manga work, as an illustrator she has also done work for a number of books, album covers, a card game, and a cover of the adult manga magazine Lemon People.

After a 16-year hiatus, in 2014 she returned to work as animator, serving as animation director of single episodes of The Pilot's Love Song, Date A Live II, Aldnoah.Zero, Psycho-Pass 2, Shirogane no Ishi Argevollen, Shinmai Maō no Testament, as well as TV episodes and a TV movie of Lupin the Third.

Kakinouchi is married to anime director Toshiki Hirano, with whom she has frequently collaborated on manga and anime projects.

Anime works

TV series
 Dr. Slump & Arale-chan (key animation, original designs)
 Kimagure Orange Road (original designs, opening and ending animation for episode 1–8)
 Magical Emi, the Magic Star (animation director for episode 34)
 Magical Princess Minky Momo (original designs for episode 10 and 15)
 Ninja Senshi Tobikage (animation director for episodes 25 and 41)
 Pastel Yumi, the Magic Idol (animation director for episode 25)
 Plawres Sanshiro (original designs for episode 28)
 Space Runaway Ideon (key animation)
 The Super Dimension Fortress Macross (original designs (episodes 4, 7, 12, 19, 26, 31, 36), assistant production director (episodes 19, 26))
 Urusei Yatsura (key animation, original designs)
 Vampire Princess Miyu (character designs, original designs, opening animation for episode 25)

Movies
 Crusher Joe (original designs)
 Macross: Do You Remember Love? (assistant animation director)
 Space Runaway Ideon (in-between animation)

Original video animations
 Cosmos Pink Shock (original designs, animation director)
 Cream Lemon: Don't Do It Mako! Mako Sexy Symphony (original designs, animation director)
 Daimajuu Gekitō Hagane no Oni (original designs)
 Dangaioh (animation director for episodes 1 and 3)
 Fight! Iczer One (original designs, animation director)
 Iczer Reborn (original designs)
 Megazone 23 (original designs, animation director)
 Neko Neko Gensōkyoku (character designs)
 Ryokunohara Labyrinth: Sparkling Phantom (director, character designs, scenario, storyboards, animation director)
 Vampire Princess Miyu (character designs, storyboards, animation director)

Original works

Manga
 
 
 
  (with Toshiki Hirano)
 Fairy Jewel
 
  (sequel)
  (sequel)
 
 
 
  (with Toshiki Hirano)
  (with Toshiki Hirano)
 
 
 
 
 
 Snow Sugar
 
 
  (sequel, with Toshiki Hirano)
  (spin-off)
 
 The Wanderer

Book illustrations
Listed alphabetically by author.
 Kagami no Naka no Atashi e... by Mariko Aihara
 Nagai Nagai Yoru no Mahō by Mariko Aihara
 Saka no Ie no Himitsu by Mariko Aihara
 Ushinawareta Koi no Monogatari by Mariko Aihara
 Yureru Manazashi by Rie Akagi
 Koi Shōjo wa Meitantei by Kae Oda
 Koi Shōjo wa Meitantei 2: I Love You wa Kikoenai by Kae Oda
 Koi Shōjo wa Meitantei 3: Koibito Game by Kae Oda
 Yakushiji Ryōko no Kaiki Jikenbo: Black Spider Island by Yoshiki Tanaka
 Yakushiji Ryōko no Kaiki Jikenbo: Cleopatra no Sōsō by Yoshiki Tanaka
 Yakushiji Ryōko no Kaiki Jikenbo: Matenrō by Yoshiki Tanaka
 Yakushiji Ryōko no Kaiki Jikenbo: Pari Yōtohen by Yoshiki Tanaka
 Yakushiji Ryōko no Kaiki Jikenbo: Tokyo Nightmare by Yoshiki Tanaka
 Angel Eyes: Shōryō Ōkoku by Yūji Watanabe
 Girl by Kei Zushi

Album cover art
 Everything by Fluke Beauty 2007

Games
 Arcus II: Silent Symphony (art director)
 Click Manga: Le Fantôme de l'Opéra (original design, character design)
 Zoku Hatsukoi Monogatari: Shūgaku Ryokō (character design)

References

External links
 Narumi Kakinouchi at Media Arts Database 
 Kakinouchi Narumi Official Page 

1962 births
Living people
Anime character designers
Anime directors
Japanese film directors
Japanese women film directors
Japanese animators
Manga artists from Osaka Prefecture
Women manga artists
Japanese women animators
Japanese female comics artists
Japanese storyboard artists